Election will be held in Autonomous Region in Muslim Mindanao for seats in the House of Representatives of the Philippines on May 9, 2016.

Summary

Basilan
Hadjiman S. Hataman-Salliman is the incumbent but seeking for reelection. He is running for governor instead.

Lanao del Sur
Each of Lanao del Sur's two legislative districts will elect each representative to the House of Representatives. The candidate with the highest number of votes wins the seat

1st District
Ansarrudin Abdulmalik Alonto-Adiong is the incumbent.

2nd District
Pangalian M. Balindong is the incumbent but ineligible for reelection. He is running for governor instead.

Maguindanao
Each of Maguindanao's two legislative districts will elect each representative to the House of Representatives. The candidate with the highest number of votes wins the seat.

1st District
Bai Sandra A. Sema is the incumbent.

2nd District
Zajid G. Mangudadatu is the incumbent.

Sulu
Each of Sulu's two legislative districts will elect each representative to the House of Representatives. The candidate with the highest number of votes wins the seat

1st District
Tupay T. Loong is the incumbent.

2nd District
Neophyte congresswoman Maryam N. Arbison is the incumbent but not seeking reelection. Her party nominated her husband and former congressman Abdulmunir Mundoc Arbison.

Tawi-Tawi
Ruby M. Sahali-Tan is the incumbent.

References

External links
COMELEC - Official website of the Philippine Commission on Elections (COMELEC)
NAMFREL - Official website of National Movement for Free Elections (NAMFREL)
PPCRV - Official website of the Parish Pastoral Council for 
Responsible Voting (PPCRV)

2016 Philippine general election
Lower house elections in the Autonomous Region in Muslim Mindanao